This article displays the men's singles qualifying draw of the 2011 China Open (tennis).

Players

Seeds

Qualifiers

Qualifying draw

First qualifier

Second qualifier

Third qualifier

Fourth qualifier

References
 Qualifying Draw

2011 qualifying
2011 China Open (tennis)
Qualification for tennis tournaments